Spinus is a genus of passerine birds in the finch family. It contains the North and South American siskins and goldfinches, as well as two Old World species. The genus name is from the Ancient Greek  spínos, a name for a now-unidentifiable bird.

All of the species in the genus, except for the Tibetan serin, were formerly included in the genus Carduelis. They were moved to the resurrected genus Spinus based on phylogenetic studies of mitochondrial and nuclear DNA sequences. The Tibetan serin was formerly placed in the genus Serinus. The Eurasian siskin and the Tibetan serin are the only species from the Old World included in the group.

The genus Spinus was introduced in 1816 by the German naturalist Carl Ludwig Koch with the Eurasian siskin (Spinus spinus) as the type species.

Evolution and phylogeny 
The Tibetan serin is an outgroup within Spinus, having been the first to diverge.  The remainder of the genus can be divided into three monophyletic clades: the North American goldfinches (Lawrence's, lesser, and American); the so-called North American siskins (Eurasian, pine, Antillean, and black-capped); and the South American siskins (the remaining 12 species).

The radiation of South American siskins was rapid, and was originally thought to have occurred around 3.5 million years ago due to a range expansion associated with the Great American Interchange and contingent upon the spread of mesothermal plants from the Rocky Mountains to the Andes. More recent work suggests the radiation occurred much later, within the last 1 million years, and speciation events may have been initiated by the climactic variations of the late Pleistocene.

The hooded siskin may be paraphyletic.

Ecology 
Spinus finches are gregarious and may breed and forage in small groups. In the non-breeding season, these species generally disperse away from the breeding grounds and small flocks roam nomadically in search of food; these flocks may be of one species or mixed with other species in the genus. Some species, such as the pine siskin and thick-billed siskin, are considered irruptive.

Like most other members of Carduelinae, but unusually amongst songbirds, members of Spinus are primarily granivorous, but may occasionally supplement their diet with insects or fruit.  Most species eat a variety of small seeds, especially from asters, grasses, alders, and birches.

Conservation 
The IUCN lists 17 species as least concern, two as vulnerable (saffron siskin and yellow-faced siskin), and one, the red siskin, as endangered.  Species in this clade are threatened by habitat loss and capture for the cage-bird trade.

Species
The genus contains 20 species:

References

 
Fringillidae
Bird genera